Numbers Lucent is a 6-track EP by English electronic musician Squarepusher, which was released on 19 January 2009.

The cover artwork is in a similar vein to that of his previous release, Just a Souvenir, but the tracks featured here are much more uptempo and energetic, and are aimed at the dance floor as much as the home listener. There is a strong early 1990s rave feel to many of the tracks, and most feature samples from early rave tunes by artists such as Rhythm Section (Rennie Pilgrem and Ellis Dee), Acen Razvi and The Prodigy, combined with Squarepusher's trademark glitchy jazz sound.

Track listing

References

External links
 Numbers Lucent at the Warp Records website
 http://www.discogs.com/release/1613617

2009 EPs
Squarepusher EPs